Gu Ja-cheong (born 22 January 1967) is a South Korean archer. He competed in the men's individual event at the 1984 Summer Olympics.

References

External links
 

1967 births
Living people
South Korean male archers
Olympic archers of South Korea
Archers at the 1984 Summer Olympics
Place of birth missing (living people)
Asian Games medalists in archery
Archers at the 1986 Asian Games
Asian Games gold medalists for South Korea
Asian Games silver medalists for South Korea
Asian Games bronze medalists for South Korea
Medalists at the 1986 Asian Games
20th-century South Korean people